The American Genealogist is a quarterly peer-reviewed academic journal which focuses on genealogy and family history. It was established by Donald Lines Jacobus in 1922 as the New Haven Genealogical Magazine. In July 1932 it was renamed The American Genealogist and New Haven Genealogical Magazine and the last part of the title was dropped in 1937, giving the journal its current title. All editors have been fellows of the American Society of Genealogists.

Editors-in-chief
The following persons have been editors-in-chief:
 Donald Lines Jacobus, 1922-1965
 George E. McCracken, 1966–1983
 Robert Moody Sherman, 1984, and Ruth Wilder Sherman, 1984-1992
 David L. Greene, 1993–2014
 Nathaniel Lane Taylor, 2015–present

Abstracting and indexing 
The journal is indexed in the Periodical Source Index and Book Review Index Online Plus.

References

External links

The American Genealogist at AmericanAncestors; complete text of all back issues 1922–2007.

Quarterly journals
Publications established in 1922
English-language journals
History of the United States journals